Thalekunnil Basheer (7 March 1945 – 25 March 2022) was an Indian politician from Indian National Congress. Basheer first entered politics in 1977, when he was elected to the Kazhakuttam Legislative Assembly. After Congress named A.K. Antony as Chief Minister, Basheer resigned his seat to allow Antony to run for the Assembly. He was a member of Rajya Sabha from 1977 to 1979 and from 1979 to 1984, and a member of Lok Sabha from 1984 to 1989 and 1989 to 1991 when he was elected in the Chirayankeezhu Lok Sabha seat. He later served as District Congress Committee president, Thiruvananthapuram and general secretary, and vice president of KPCC.

He was a brother in law of Malayalam actor Prem Nazir, having married Nazir's younger sister Suhra.

Basheer died from a heart attack at his home in Vembayam on March 25, 2022, at the age of 77.

References

External links
 

1945 births
2022 deaths
Malayali politicians
Indian National Congress politicians from Kerala
20th-century Indian Muslims
India MPs 1984–1989
India MPs 1989–1991
Lok Sabha members from Kerala
Rajya Sabha members from Kerala
Politicians from Thiruvananthapuram